Cody Brendan Wood is an actor, singer, violinist, and songwriter living in Los Angeles, California.

Personal life
Wood was born in Santa Fe, New Mexico, and was raised in Phoenix, Arizona, and Weston, Massachusetts. He attended college at Case Western Reserve University in Cleveland, Ohio, and completed degrees in music and biomedical engineering.

Music videos

Tate Stevens "Holler if You're With Me"  (violinist)

Qwiet feat. Cody Wood "To the Sky" (singer, writer)

Studio singles

Cody Wood feat. Morgan Paros "Collage" (vocals, violin)

Sarah Dokowicz "With You" (writer, producer)

Qwiet feat. Cody Wood "To the Sky" (vocals, writer)

Cody Wood "How to Love" (vocals, violin)

Cora Lakey "On My Own" (writer, producer)

Awards and nominations

Emerging Artist Award, Gen Art Film Festival NYC (2011)

Grammy Award for Best Choral Performance in Krzysztof Penderecki's Credo (Phoenix Boys Choir 2000)

Finalist in the John Lennon Songwriting Contest (BMI 2009)

Studio violin

"I Melt With You" - feature film soundtrack

"Sudden Death" - feature film soundtrack

"Forever Found" (Kan Wakan)  - studio single

Further reading
Leavitt, S (2009). "Congratulations to MENC’s 2009 BMI John Lennon state finalists!". BMI John Lennon.
BMI John Lennon Scholarship Finalist Information

Internet Movie Database (2009).
IMDB

Scaparotta, C (2009). "Weston native sets his sights on stardom", The Weston Town Crier.
The Weston Town Crier

Hunt, R (2009). "Hitting the Spot: Cody Wood", The CWRU Observer.
The CWRU Observer

The Cleveland Institute of Music (2009). "Carol Ruzicka, CIM.
Faculty Biography: Carol Ruzicka

The Cleveland Institute of Music (2009). "Cynthia Wohlschlager, CIM.
Faculty Biography: Cynthia Wohschlager

CWRU Undergraduate Studies (2005).  "Class Officers", Second Year Newsletter.
CWRU Class Officer Election

Factor, M (2008). "Case alum makes name for himself in recording world", The CWRU Observer.
The CWRU Observer

Department of Biomedical Engineering (2007). "Case BME Undergrad Helps Author Textbook", CWRU Biomedical Engineering.
Case Western Reserve University - Department of Biomedical Engineering

Artech House (2007).  "Systems Bioinformatics: An Engineering Case-Based Approach", Artech House Bookstore.
Artech House

Alterovitz, G (2009). "Referred Publications", Publications
MIT 2009, Gil Alterovitz

Plotkin, M (2008).  "Cody Wood", Projects.
Marc Plotkin Official Website

The Phoenix Boys Choir (2009).  "Awards and Honors", ''The Phoenix Boys Choir".
The Phoenix Boys Choir

References

External links
 Cody Wood Official Website

1984 births
Living people
Musicians from Los Angeles